Thumpoly St. Thomas Church Marian Pilgrimage Shrine  is a church in Thumpoly, Kerala, India, and is a well-known Christian Marian pilgrimage site/shrine. This Church Includes under the Diocese of Alleppey-(Roman Catholic Diocese  of Alleppey ). Thumpoly is located 6 kilometers from Alappuzha city, 80 kilometers  from Kochi International Airport, 60 Kilometers from Kochi -Cochin City ,  20 kilometers from Cherthala,  25 kilometers from Kuttanadu, 34 Kilometers from Changanassery  and 52 kilometers from Kayamkulam. This is an ancient church with a long tradition that was built by the Portuguese and was established in the 1600s.  It is one of the important Christian pilgrimage centers of Alappuzha district. It is the second most important pilgrimage or Church centre in the Diocese of Alleppey.

History of Thumpoly Church 

Thumpoly church was established in the 1600s. It was initially a small church. The first church was a small church with ola pastures.  During the 1600s a ship sailed from Paris (Portugal/Also said to be from Italy) across the Arabian Sea, losing control of the ship due to wind, rain and thunder and sank, leading a statue to be enshrined in the Thumpoly  Church. In the 1700s the current church was built by the Portuguese, who established 23 Churches in Kerala, and it is known and known as the first church of its kind.   Between the years 1600 and 1700, there was only a small church in Thumpoly.  Between those periods efforts were made to build a large Church at Thumpoly .  But all of them were attacked in war and so on and due to financial difficulties it was not possible to build a big church like it is now.  Later, in 1700, the grand church as seen today was built.     Thumpoly church was the first church in India at that time to have a relic of the Mother of God and rituals.  This Thumpoly mata mother is also known by another name, ``Kappalottakaari Amma ´´ or "sailors mother".or 'the mother who came by ship in the year 1600- 1602s. And also Thumpoly Church and Poomkavu Church are important Christian pilgrimage centers located very close to each other in Alappuzha district.  This Poomkavu church is a famous holy week pilgrimage.

Features of  Thumpoly Church /Important . 

 Established in the AD 1600
 In 1600s in India, the Statue of the Mother of God (Holy Virgin Mary) was first enshrined here in Thumpoly Church.
 Thumpoly Church is likely to get `Minor Basilica´ status / other `Higher status´.
 Thumpoly Mata is also known as Kapalottakkari Amma.(Because Thumpoli Mata came on Ship).
 Thumpoly is one of the most important Christian pilgrimage shrines in Kerala.
 It is an important Marian pilgrimage shrine in Alappuzha District and Diocese of Alleppey .

 Thumpoly Church and Poomkavu Church are important Christian pilgrimage centers located very close to each other in Alappuzha district.  This Poomkavu church is a famous holy week pilgrimage shrine.

Thumpoly Festival feast 

Darshana thirunal of Amalolbhava mata Immaculate Conception (Thumpoly Mata) is celebrated every year from November 27 to December 15 at Thumpoly church. The main festival day is December 08th. Ettaammidam thirunal festival day is December 15th.  Opening of Thiruswaroopa ``Thirunada Thurakkal´´ of Mother of Thumpoly mata on 06th December. The Thumpoly church festival ends at midnight on December 15th. Important Vow(Nercha) is the ``Pattum Kireedavum Ezhunnallippu´´The main votive offering is the `Silk and the Crown Ezhunnallippu´. And there are many other vows/offerings). And on the first Sunday of July, the week of Thomasliha - St.  Thomas's feast day is also celebrated.  The Feast of the Birth/Nativity of the Blessed Virgin Mary is celebrated from September 1st to September 08th.  Every year from 01st to 31st October the month of Japamala/The rosary is celebrated as a celebration. This is one of the biggest Marian Festival(Feast) and Pilgrimage Church seen in Kerala & Alappuzha District.

References

Churches in Alappuzha district